Poporama was a weekly radio show on Swedish National Radio (Sveriges Radio P3) from 1974 to 1984, presented by Kaj Kindvall, that listed the hits of the week. Poporama replaced the radio show Tio i Topp that had done this up until June 1974. The official Poporama singles charts were published in 1992 in the book Poporama - Heta Högen 1974–1984 by Stefan Heiding.

Further reading
 About Poporama

References

Swedish radio programs